Dan Peter Ulvestad (born 4 April 1989) is a Norwegian footballer who plays for Eliteserien club Kristiansund.

Career statistics

Club

References

1989 births
Living people
Sportspeople from Ålesund
Norwegian footballers
Eliteserien players
Norwegian First Division players
Aalesunds FK players
Kristiansund BK players
Association football defenders